Protocol No. 12 to the Convention for the Protection of Human Rights and Fundamental Freedoms (ETS No. 177) is an anti-discrimination treaty of the Council of Europe. It was adopted on November 4, 2000, in Rome and entered into force on April 1, 2005, after tenth ratification. As of 2017, it has been ratified by 20 States  (from 47 CoE member states).

Core provisions

Article 1 – General prohibition of discrimination. 1 The enjoyment of any right set forth by law shall be secured without discrimination on any ground such as sex, race, colour, language, religion, political or other opinion, national or social origin, association with a national minority, property, birth or other status. 2 No one shall be discriminated against by any public authority on any ground such as those mentioned in paragraph 1.

Unlike Article 14 of the Convention itself, the prohibition of discrimination in Protocol 12 is not limited to enjoying only those rights provided by the Convention.

Application

The first case, where the European Court of Human Rights has found a violation of Article 1 of Protocol No. 12, was Sejdić and Finci v. Bosnia and Herzegovina, adjudicated in 2009.

References

External links
Text
Explanatory report
Chart of signatures and ratifications

Treaties concluded in 2000
Council of Europe treaties
European Convention on Human Rights
Anti-discrimination treaties
Treaties of Albania
Treaties of Andorra
Treaties of Armenia
Treaties of Bosnia and Herzegovina
Treaties of Croatia
Treaties of Cyprus
Treaties of Finland
Treaties of Georgia (country)
Treaties of Luxembourg
Treaties of Montenegro
Treaties of the Netherlands
Treaties of Portugal
Treaties of Romania
Treaties of San Marino
Treaties of Serbia and Montenegro
Treaties of Slovenia
Treaties of Spain
Treaties of North Macedonia
Treaties of Ukraine
Treaties entered into force in 2005
Treaties extended to Aruba
Treaties extended to the Netherlands Antilles